Southwest Mississippi Community College is a public community college in Summit, Mississippi.

History
The college was officially started in 1908 as an agricultural high school. The Pike County Agricultural High School opened on September 3, 1918, after receiving approval from the Pike County School Board the previous April. The high school began to incorporate college work into the curriculum in 1929 and by 1932 the school had become a junior college. Fifty-four years later in 1988, the name of the school was officially changed to Southwest Mississippi Community College.

Notable alumni
Woodie Assaf, longtime weatherman at WLBT in Jackson
Jarrod Dyson, outfielder for the Seattle Mariners, former outfielder for the 2015  World Series Kansas City Royals
David Green, Mississippi state legislator
Billy Milner 1995 first round draft pick of the Miami Dolphins
Glover Quin an American football safety for the Detroit Lions of the National Football League (NFL).
Cannan May, leader of the "Free Canaan May" movement.

References

External links
 Official website
 Official athletics website

 
Community colleges in Mississippi
1908 establishments in Mississippi
Universities and colleges accredited by the Southern Association of Colleges and Schools
Schools in Pike County, Mississippi
NJCAA athletics